Solotaroff is a German-language transliteration of the Russian surname Zolotaryov. Notable people with this surname include:

 Hillel Solotaroff (1865–1921), a Russian–American doctor known for his participation in the New York Yiddish anarchist movement
 Lynn Solotaroff (1929–1994), an American translator of Tolstoy and Chekhov
 Ted Solotaroff (1928–2008), an American writer, editor and literary critic

German-language surnames
Russian-language surnames